In Norse mythology, Sliðr is a river in  Hel, the land of the dead. Glaciers pour into it from the freezing well of Hvergelmir, and swords turn beneath its waters.

Rivers in Norse mythology

fr:Slidr